Zhang Yage is a Chinese rower. At the 2012 Summer Olympics, she competed in the Women's coxless pair.

References

Chinese female rowers
Year of birth missing (living people)
Living people
Olympic rowers of China
Rowers at the 2012 Summer Olympics
Sportspeople from Henan